The Conference on Student Government Associations (otherwise known as COSGA) is a -year-old annual convention of college student governments that serves as the largest student-run student government conference in the United States. It annually hosts hundreds of delegates representing student governments all around the world.  The purpose of the conference is to improve student government associations by creating an environment for open discussion among schools of varying sizes and locations. The conference is held at Texas A&M University.

Conference Information

COSGA has a variety of events that place delegates together in very social and professional environments. These events range from round tables where delegates sit among one another and discuss ideas and programs that have been successful on their campuses, to night life events where delegates are taken out to see a bit more of the fun side of the conference. All of these events, and the conference as a whole, are run by student government members at Texas A&M University. Every year, the primary focus of the conference, also shown through the theme, is maximizing the effectiveness of their student government.

2020–21 saw the conference held virtually.

References

External links
http://www.cosga.net
http://cosga.tamu.edu

1981 establishments in the United States
Student governments in the United States
Conventions in Texas
Texas A&M University traditions